A stack or sea stack is a geological landform consisting of a steep and often vertical column or columns of rock in the sea near a coast, formed by wave erosion. Stacks are formed over time by wind and water, processes of coastal geomorphology. They are formed when part of a headland is eroded by hydraulic action, which is the force of the sea or water crashing against the rock. The force of the water weakens cracks in the headland, causing them to later collapse, forming free-standing stacks and even a small island. Without the constant presence of water, stacks also form when a natural arch collapses under gravity, due to sub-aerial processes like wind erosion. Erosion causes the arch to collapse, leaving the pillar of hard rock standing away from the coast—the stack. Eventually, erosion will cause the stack to collapse, leaving a stump. Stacks can provide important nesting locations for seabirds, and many are popular for rock climbing.

Isolated steep-sided, rocky oceanic islets typically of volcanic origin, are also loosely called "stacks" or "volcanic stacks".

Formation
Stacks typically form in horizontally-bedded sedimentary or volcanic rocks, particularly on limestone cliffs. The medium hardness of these rocks means medium resistance to abrasive and attritive erosion. A more resistant layer may form a capstone. (Cliffs with weaker rock, such as claystone or highly jointed rock, tend to slump and erode too quickly to form stacks, while harder rocks such as granite erode in different ways.)

The formation process usually begins when the sea attacks lines of weakness, such as steep joints or small fault zones in a cliff face. These cracks then gradually get larger and turn into caves. If a cave wears through a headland, an arch forms. Further erosion causes the arch to collapse, leaving the pillar of hard rock standing away from the coast, the stack. Eventually, erosion will cause the stack to collapse, leaving a stump. This stump usually forms a small rock island, low enough for a high tide to submerge.

See also
 Ball's Pyramid, the tallest sea stack in the world
 List of sea stacks
 Rauk

References

External links

 
Coastal and oceanic landforms
Coastal geography